Buster Phelps (November 5, 1926 – January 10, 1983) was an American actor.

Phelps debuted on film when he was a child. When the mother of another child had booked two simultaneous film sessions for that youngster, she contacted Phelps' mother about taking one of the roles. In 1932, he was signed to portray Mitzi Green’s brother in the film Little Orphan Annie.

Phelps also appeared in the films The Sin of Madelon Claudet, Stepping Sisters, A Fool's Advice, Scandal for Sale, Three on a Match, Handle with Care, Frisco Jenny, Sailor's Luck, The World Gone Mad, Laughing at Life, One Man's Journey, Night Flight, Broken Dreams, Servants' Entrance, Strange Wives, Little Men, Anna Karenina, The Affair of Susan, Too Many Parents, Libeled Lady, The Howards of Virginia, Slightly Tempted, And the Angels Sing and Mother Is a Freshman, among others.

Partial filmography

Night Work (1930 film)\Night Work (1930) - Orphan (uncredited)
Feet First (1930) - Little Boy (uncredited)
 Left Over Ladies (1931) - Buddy
The Sin of Madelon Claudet (1931) - Larry Claudet - Toddler (uncredited)
Stepping Sisters (1932) - Germany (uncredited)
A Fool's Advice (1932) - Buster the Kid
Scandal for Sale (1932) - Bobby Strong
Three on a Match (1932) - Robert Kirkwood Jr.
Little Orphan Annie (1932) - Mickey
Handle with Care (1932) - Tommy
Frisco Jenny (1932) - Dan as a Child (uncredited)
Sailor's Luck (1933) - Elmer Brown Jr.
The World Gone Mad (1933) - Ralph Henderson
Laughing at Life (1933) - Young Pat 'Denny' McHale
One Man's Journey (1933) - Jimmy Watt - Age 6
Night Flight (1933) - Sick Child
Broken Dreams (1933) - Billy Morley
Now and Forever (1934) - Boy With Skates (uncredited)
Servants' Entrance (1934) - Tommy
Strange Wives (1934) - Twin
Little Men (1934) - Dick
Anna Karenina (1935) - Grisha
The Affair of Susan (1935) - Hogan Jr. (uncredited)
I Live My Life (1935) - Child at Christmas Party (uncredited)
Too Many Parents (1936) - Clinton Meadows
Libeled Lady (1936) - Waif (uncredited)
Girl Loves Boy (1937) - Ned McCarthy
Little Tough Guy (1938) - Kid (uncredited)
Big Town Czar (1939) - Boy (uncredited)
Hero for a Day (1939) - First Boy (uncredited)
The Blue Bird (1940) - Boy Inventor (uncredited)
The Howards of Virginia (1940) - Tom Jefferson at 11
Slightly Tempted (1940) - Ray (uncredited)
Meet the Chump (1940) - Newsboy (uncredited)
The Wagons Roll at Night (1941) - Boy (uncredited)
And the Angels Sing (1944) - Spud (uncredited)
Tomorrow Is Forever (1946) - Fraternity Boy (uncredited)
Mother Is a Freshman (1949) - Jack (uncredited) (final film role)

References

External links
 

1926 births
1983 deaths
20th-century American male actors
American male film actors
Male actors from Los Angeles
American male child actors